Isometheptene (usually as isometheptene mucate) is a sympathomimetic amine sometimes used in the treatment of migraines and tension headaches due to its vasoconstricting properties; that is, it causes constriction (narrowing) of blood vessels (arteries and veins). Along with paracetamol and dichloralphenazone, it is one of the constituents of Amidrine.

Chemistry 
Isometheptene is a monounsaturated aliphatic secondary amine.

Mechanism of action 
Isometheptene's vasoconstricting properties arise through activation of the sympathetic nervous system via epinephrine and norepinephrine. These compounds elicit smooth muscle activation leading to vasoconstriction by interacting with cell surface adrenergic receptors.

See also 
 Heptaminol
 Methylhexanamine
 Tuaminoheptane

References 

Alkene derivatives
Alpha-1 adrenergic receptor agonists
Sympathomimetic amines